Thomas Coote (1850 – 24 October 1939 at Hythe, Kent) was an English coal merchant and Liberal politician.

Coote was born at Fenstanton, Huntingdonshire, the son of Thomas Coote of  St Ives, Huntingdonshire. He was educated privately and became a coal merchant in the firm of Coote & Son, Coal Merchants, of St Ives.

In the 1885 general election, Coote was elected Member of Parliament for Huntingdon but lost the seat in the 1886 general election. He had stood as the Liberal candidate in the Cambridgeshire by-election, 21 March 1884. He was a member of the Reform Club and an original member of the National Liberal Club.

Coote married in 1878, Elizabeth Pauline Day. They lived at Ambury House, Huntingdon.

References

External links 
 

1850 births
1939 deaths
Liberal Party (UK) MPs for English constituencies
UK MPs 1885–1886
People from Fenstanton
People from Huntingdon